Galanter & Jones is a San Francisco-based design and fabrication studio known for its heated seating.

History 
The studio was founded by the siblings Aaron and Miranda Jones in 2012. The company debuted with heated outdoor seating.

The company is known for its heated furniture which is an alternative to traditional outdoor heating methods.

In 2015, Galanter & Jones was awarded Best Outdoor at Dwell on Design.

In 2018, the company won the Furniture Innovation award at San Francisco Design Week.

Galanter & Jones has received coverage from various publications such as Elle Decor, House Beautiful, and Dwell among others.

References

External links 
Official website

Design companies established in 2012
American companies established in 2012
Companies based in San Francisco
2012 establishments in California